NGC 5529 is an edge-on intermediate spiral galaxy in the constellation Boötes. It is located approximately 144 million light-years (44 megaparsecs) away and was discovered by William Herschel on May 1, 1785.

NGC 5529 is an edge-on intermediate galaxy. It is located near dwarf galaxies PGC 50952, and PGC 50925.

Polycyclic aromatic hydrocarbons (PAHs) have been detected in the mid-infrared spectrum of NGC 5529. PAHs have been shown to only appear in galaxies with recent star formation.

References

External links
 

5529
Boötes
Intermediate spiral galaxies
009127
050942